Karla Delago (born 8 February 1965) is a former Italian World Cup alpine ski racer, and specializes in the speed events, winner of six Italian titles in just four years in which she competed.

Family
Four Alpine skiers from the Delago family have participated in World Cup and World Championships competitions. Siblings Oskar (born 1963) and Karla Delago (born 1965), specialists in speed events in the 1980s and their two granddaughters, Nicol (born 1996) and Nadia (born 1997), active in the 2010s.

Career
Karla Delago's career began in 1983–84 at the age of 18 when she made her debut in the world cup by scoring (i.e. classified among the top 15), 17 times in only 18 races. However, following an injury she had in the summer of 1987, she never returned to compete, just when she had obtained the qualification for the 1988 Calgary Olympics. Therefore her very promising career ended definitively prematurely at the age of only 22 years old.

World Cup results
Top 10

National titles
Italian Alpine Ski Championships
Downhill: 1983, 1984, 1985, 1986
Combined: 1983, 1986

References

External links
 

1965 births
Living people
Italian female alpine skiers
Sportspeople from Brixen